The Office of the Special Prosecutor of Ghana was established after an act of the Parliament of Ghana passed the Office of Special Prosecutor Bill in 2017.

The office serves as an independent investigating and prosecution body to make inquiries into corruption, bribery, or other criminal cases at the national level whether they be in public or private sector.

Purpose 

The NPP Government intended to lessen the burden on existing anti-corruption agencies and remove the institutional roadblocks that exist as hindrances to the fight against corruption. With the end result being to make anti-corruption agencies in the country more effective at discharging their duties. 

In addition, government experts have expressed the ineffectiveness of the Attorney-General as an effective prosecution and law enforcement tool in the fight against corruption because the appointment and dismissal of the  Attorney-General is determined by the president.

Therefore, the Office of the special prosecutor serves as the autonomous body to handle sensitive cases which the Attorney General will otherwise be ineffective at handling.         

Martin Amidu is the first to hold the position of special prosecutor.

See also 
 Corruption in Ghana

References

Corruption in Ghana
Judiciary of Ghana
Presidency of Nana Akufo-Addo